The M1, M2, M3, and M4 are four local bus routes that operate the Fifth and Madison Avenues Lines – along the one-way pair of Madison and Fifth Avenues in the Manhattan borough of New York City. Though the routes also run along other major avenues, the majority of their route is along Madison and Fifth Avenues between Greenwich Village and Harlem.

The routes are the successors to the New York and Harlem Railroad's Fourth and Madison Avenues Line, which began operations in 1832 as the first street railway in the world, and several lines of the Fifth Avenue Coach Company, a bus operator that started running on Fifth Avenue in 1886.

Description
The M1, M2, M3, and M4 all run between Midtown or Lower Manhattan and Upper Manhattan, while the Q32 runs from Midtown north along Fifth and Madison Avenues and east over the Queensboro Bridge to Jackson Heights, Queens. The M4 terminates and originates near 32nd Street, while the Q32 begins at Penn Station, joining Madison Avenue at 32nd Street (northbound) and leaving Fifth Avenue at 37th Street (southbound). Thus, all five routes are on Fifth and Madison Avenues from 34th Street to 110th Street.

M1
The M1 begins its route in SoHo at the intersection of Centre Street and Grand Street. It continues up Centre and Lafayette Streets, then 4th Avenue to Union Square, where it changes names to Union Square East. Union Square East continues past Union Square as Park Avenue South. The M1 turns off Park Avenue South at East 25th Street for one block, and then immediately turns right onto Madison Avenue. The M1 follows Madison Avenue all the way to East 135th Street, where it again turns left for one block, and then immediately turns right onto Fifth Avenue (becoming a two-way at this point). It travels up Fifth to West 139th Street, turns left for a block, and turns right onto Lenox Avenue to its terminus at 148th Street. The M1 travels south the same route, but entirely on Fifth Avenue between 139th Street and 8th Street (except for a short deviation around Marcus Garvey Park at 124th Street), then on Broadway from 8th Street to Grand Street.

During weekdays, every other southbound trip terminates in East Village, Manhattan, using 8th Street (St. Marks Place) to travel between 5th and 4th Avenues. All trips run to/from Grand Street on weekends.

The M1 has a peak direction limited stop service on weekday rush hours, making limited stops between 8th Street and 110th Street (northbound) or 132nd Street (southbound); it is local at all other times. The M1 is the replacement of the Fourth and Madison Avenues Streetcar Line.

M2
The M2 follows the same route as the M1 north until East 110th Street, where it turns west. It travels around Duke Ellington Circle and along Central Park North to Adam Clayton Powell Jr. Boulevard and turns right (north). The M2 follows 7th Avenue (as it is locally known) until West 155th Street, where it turns left and then turns right onto Edgecombe Avenue. The M2 follows Edgecombe Avenue to West 165th Street, and terminates at West 168th Street and Audubon Avenue. It follows the same route south, except using Fifth Avenue instead of Madison.

The M2 runs as a limited-stop service, making limited stops south of 110th Street with no local service during the daytime. At other times, it runs local only.

M3
The M3 follows the same route as the M2, except it continues west past Powell Boulevard along West 110th Street to Manhattan Avenue. It follows Manhattan Avenue, which becomes St. Nicholas Avenue. At 190th Street, the northbound M3 turns west, then continues north along Amsterdam Avenue to a terminus on Fort George Avenue. Southbound buses begin on Fort George Avenue and continue down St. Nicholas Avenue, Manhattan Avenue, Central Park North, and Fifth Avenue. During late nights the M3 terminates at St. Nicholas Avenue and West 125th Street.

M4

The M4 begins at the intersection of East 32nd Street and Fifth Avenue in Midtown Manhattan. It turns left onto Madison Avenue and follows the same route as the M3 from here, except it continues west past Manhattan Avenue along West 110th Street, then Cathedral Parkway, to Broadway. The M4 turns north onto Broadway and travels along Broadway to West 165th Street. At 165th Street, the M4 turns left and then immediately turns right onto Fort Washington Avenue.  The M4 continues up Ft. Washington Avenue to the entrance of Fort Tryon Park. When The Cloisters Museum is open, the M4 continues north along Margaret Corbin Drive to the entrance to the museum.

M4 buses make limited-stops in the peak direction during weekday rush hours (downtown in the morning, uptown in the evening),making limited stops south of 157th Street while also making local stops along 110th Street. Local service runs at all other times.

History

The Fourth and Madison Avenues Line
The New York and Harlem Railroad was the first railroad in Manhattan, opening from City Hall north along Centre Street, Broome Street (northbound trains were later moved to Grand Street), the Bowery, Fourth Avenue, and Park Avenue to Harlem in the 1830s, and was extended southwest along Park Row to Broadway in 1852. A branch opened along 42nd Street and Madison Avenue to 73rd Street in 1870, and the NY&H began to operate streetcars along this route; it was later extended to Harlem. Buses were substituted for streetcars by the Madison Avenue Coach Company in March 1936. The New York City Omnibus Corporation took over operations in 1951, and changed its name to Fifth Avenue Coach Lines in 1956; the Manhattan and Bronx Surface Transit Operating Authority took over operations in 1962.

When the bus that replaced the Lexington and Lenox Avenues Line was terminated, the Madison Avenue bus was extended west on 139th Street and north on Lenox Avenue to 147th Street. When Madison Avenue became one-way northbound, southbound traffic was moved to Fifth Avenue, replacing the original route of the Fifth Avenue Coach Company.
The Fifth Avenue Transportation Company (later the Fifth Avenue Coach Company) began operating stages on Fifth Avenue between 11th Street and 59th Street on January 23, 1886. The company was formed because the wealthy residents of Fifth Avenue did not want a street railway.  The route was later extended south to Washington Square Park and north to 89th Street, and in 1900 the company was authorized to extend north to 135th Street, and to operate on other streets including 110th Street and Riverside Drive to 124th Street. More extensions, on 32nd Street from Fifth Avenue west to Seventh Avenue (Penn Station) and north from 110th Street on Seventh Avenue and Manhattan Avenue/St. Nicholas Avenue to 155th Street, were soon authorized. After the company's horse cars were replaced with motor buses in July 1907, it began operating these extensions, and assigned them numbers in 1916 or 1917:
Fifth Avenue to 135th Street
Fifth and Seventh Avenues to Polo Grounds (155th Street and St. Nicholas Place)
Fifth and St. Nicholas Avenues to Polo Grounds
Fifth Avenue and Riverside Drive via 110th Street to 135th Street and Broadway
Fifth Avenue and Riverside Drive via 57th Street to 135th Street and Broadway
72nd Street Crosstown via 57th Street

The Fifth Avenue Coach Company (FACCo) obtained a permit on July 1, 1925, and on July 9 began operating its 15 and 16 routes. The 15 (now the Q32) began at Fifth Avenue and 25th Street at Madison Square Park, and traveled north on Fifth Avenue, east via 57th Street to the Queensboro Bridge, and along Queens Boulevard, Roosevelt Avenue, and 25th Street (now 82nd Street) to Northern Boulevard in Jackson Heights, Queens. The short 16 (Elmhurst Crosstown) was renamed Q89 on July 1, 1974, began at Roosevelt Avenue and 82nd Street and used Baxter Avenue and Broadway to reach Queens Boulevard in Elmhurst.

Even before the Fifth Avenue company began operating its coaches, the New York and Harlem Railroad was operating its Fourth and Madison Avenues Line of horse cars, later trolleys, mainly on Fourth Avenue below and Madison Avenue above 42nd Street (Grand Central Terminal). The Madison Avenue Coach Company, a New York Railways subsidiary, started operating replacement buses on February 1, 1935. Several changes were made to the route: instead of the Bowery, a shorter alignment via Centre Street and Lafayette Street was used, and a variant stayed on Madison Avenue south to 26th Street and short-turned at Astor Place. As part of the New York City Omnibus Corporation system (NYCO; also a New York Railways subsidiary), these two routes were numbered 1 (via Park Avenue) and 2 (short-turn via Madison Avenue).

Extensions and combinations
On July 17, 1960, Lexington Avenue and Third Avenue became a one-way pair. The NYCO's 4, which had traveled along Lexington Avenue, 116th Street, and Lenox Avenue to northern Harlem, was discontinued. To cover this travel pattern, the 1 was extended west on 135th Street and north on Lenox Avenue, and the 2 was realigned to turn west on 116th Street and north on Lenox Avenue. The path of the 1 and 2 south of Union Square was changed on November 10, 1963, to use Broadway rather than Fourth Avenue and Lafayette Street, due to Lafayette Street becoming one-way northbound and Broadway becoming one-way southbound.  On that same day, the southern terminus for FACCo's 2 and 3 was moved to 8th Street and Fourth Avenue, after terminating the prior two months at 8th Street between Fifth Avenue and University Place following a ban on all bus traffic through their prior terminus of Washington Square imposed by the city on September 2, 1963. As part of the new pattern, the 2 and 3 turned at Fourth Avenue onto Wanamaker Place and then onto Fifth Avenue.

Fifth and Madison Avenues became one-way streets on January 14, 1966, and the four FACCo routes on Fifth Avenue past Central Park and the two NYCO routes on Madison Avenue were combined into four routes on both avenues. In particular, the following changes were made:

The NYCO's 1 and FACCo's 1 were combined. The northbound route of the new 1 followed the old NYCO 1 along Park Avenue, 39th Street, Madison Avenue, 135th Street, and Lenox Avenue, and the southbound route used Lenox Avenue and 135th to join the old FACCo 1 at Fifth Avenue. Buses left the old FACCo route at 40th Street, heading south on the old NYCO route on Park Avenue and Broadway.
The NYCO's 2 and FACCo's 2 (since extended to 168th Street via Edgecombe Avenue) were combined. Again, the southbound route generally followed the FACCo's 2, and the northbound route was the NYCO's 2. North of 110th Street, the combined route had two variants, watching the two divergent routes. One, designated by MaBSTOA as the Seventh Avenue branch (and numbered 2A), followed the FACCo's 2 along 110th Street and Seventh Avenue, continuing along Seventh and Edgecombe Avenues to 168th Street, while the other (designated the Lenox Avenue branch) used 116th Street and Lenox Avenue to 147th Street (NYCO's 2).  FACCo's 2 was renamed 2A from 1966 to 1974, while NYCO's 2 had its route south of 116th Street moved to Third Avenue northbound and Lexington Avenue southbound, and its route number changed to 101A, on March 2, 1969 (renumbered M102 on July 1, 1974).
The FACCo's 3 (since extended to Fort George via St. Nicholas Avenue), 4 (since extended to Fort Tryon Park via Fort Washington Avenue, and ending at Penn Station in the south), and 15 were essentially moved northbound from Fifth Avenue to Madison Avenue south of 110th Street. Where it made a difference, the NYCO's 2 was more closely followed.

The 1 and 4 routes (later the M1 and M4, respectively) were among the first routes to get limited-stop service, in 1973.

Recent changes 
Limited-stop service on the M2 began on October 14, 1991, replacing local service between 7 a.m. and 7 p.m.

On June 25, 2010, as a result of service cuts, MTA no longer operated weekend M1 service into Midtown, instead terminating at 106th Street. After numerous requests to rescind some of the 2010 service cuts, the MTA restored the M1 to 8th Street on the weekends on January 6, 2013. There was a proposal underway to re-extend this line back down to Worth Street in early 2017. In this proposal, every other bus would go to Worth Street via Bowery and Third Avenue, returning uptown via Centre Street and Lafayette Street. The M1 was extended back down to Grand Street on September 3, 2017, though downtown buses run on Broadway. Service will eventually be re-extended to Worth Street, after which the downtown buses running below 8th Street will be rerouted onto Bowery.

In April 2018, it was proposed to permanently truncate the M4's southern terminal to 41st Street. This was due to a street-widening along 32nd Street that would cause delays for M4 buses from terminating there, since that portion of the route was shared with the Q32, which continues northward from Penn Station to Jackson Heights, Queens. The change would occur in summer 2018. To allow M4 riders to access Penn Station, and vice versa, free transfers would be available between Q32 and M4 buses going in the same direction. However, the plan was then changed to have the M4 continue down to 32nd Street, where it would terminate midway between 5th and Madison Avenues, two blocks from Penn Station.

References

External links
 

01
1886 introductions
Fifth Avenue
Madison Avenue
MTA Regional Bus routes